The Michigamme River is a  tributary of the Menominee River on the Upper Peninsula of Michigan in the United States. Via the Menominee River, its water flows to Lake Michigan.

The Michigamme River flows from Lake Michigamme in Marquette County, through Dickinson County, Michigamme Reservoir, Peavy Pond and Michigamme Lake in Iron County to its confluence with the Brule River, forming the Menominee River. The confluence can be viewed from the dam on Michigamme Lake. In addition, there is a spillway from the Paint River which flows into Peavy Pond.

See also 
 Mansfield Township, Michigan
Republic Island

References

 National Weather Service, Advanced Hydrological Prediction Service, Inflow to Michigamme Reservoir
 Michigan Department of Transportation, Mansfield Rd. / Michigamme River Bridge

Rivers of Michigan
Rivers of Marquette County, Michigan
Rivers of Dickinson County, Michigan
Rivers of Iron County, Michigan
Tributaries of Lake Michigan